Similar braille conventions are used for three languages of India and Nepal that in print are written in Devanagari script: Hindi, Marathi, and Nepali. These are part of a family of related braille alphabets known as Bharati Braille.  There are apparently some differences between the Nepali braille alphabet of India and that of Nepal.

System
Although basically alphabetic, Devanagari Braille retains one aspect of Indian abugidas, in that the default vowel a is not written unless it occurs at the beginning of a word or before a vowel. For example, braille  (the consonant K) renders print  ka, and braille  (TH), print  tha. (When writing in Hindi, the halant is generally omitted at the end of a word, following the convention in print.) However, unlike in an abugida, there are no vowel diacritics in Devanagari Braille:  Vowels are written with full letters following the consonant regardless of their order in print. For example, in print the vowel i is prefixed to a consonant in a reduced diacritic form,  ki, but in braille it follows in its full form:  (K–I), equivalent to writing  for ki in print. The one time when a non-initial a is written in braille is when it is followed by another vowel. In this environment the a must be written to indicate that it exists, as otherwise the subsequent vowel will be read as following the consonant immediately.

Apart from kṣ and jñ, which each have their own braille letter, Devanagari Braille does not handle conjuncts. Print conjuncts are rendered instead with the halant in braille. Devanagari braille is thus equivalent to Grade-1 English braille, though there are plans to extend it to conjuncts.

Alphabet

Not all of the letters used for Sanskrit are reported for Nepali in Nepal.

Codas

Pointing
The Bharati point, is used to derive the syllabic consonants.  Long syllabic consonants are prefixed by point-6, which also transcribes the visarga.

The pointing diacritic is also used for consonants that are derived with a point in print. Most of these consonants were introduced from Persian:

This is also where, at least according to UNESCO (2013), Hindi Braille and Indian Urdu Braille diverge. Urdu Braille (see) has several additional derivations along these lines, which are not possible in print Devanagari.

Nepali punctuation

Braille as used in Nepal has some mostly minor differences from that used for Nepali in India.  This may extend to punctuation.  The asterisk in Nepal, differs from the  used in India, unless this is a copy error in UNESCO (2013).  Single quotation marks and additional brackets are noted for Nepal but not for India:

These differ from the same punctuation in Bangladesh.

Text
The following is the sample text in the Hindi article, of Article 1 of the Universal Declaration of Human Rights:

⠀

Anucched 1 — Sabhī manuṣyoṃ ko gaurav aur adhikāroṃ ke māmle meṃ janmajāt svatantratā aur samāntā prāpt haiṃ.
Unheṃ buddhi aur antarātmā kī den prāpt hai aur paraspar unheṃ bhāīcāre ke bhāv se bartāv karnā cāhiye.

See also
 Bharati braille
 Urdu Braille

References

Bharati braille alphabets
Hindi
Marathi language
Nepali language
Devanagari